Iferouane, also spelled Iferouan, is an oasis town and commune in northern Niger, in Agadez Department. It is located northeast of Arlit in the northern Aïr,
in the Ighazar valley
near the Tamgak Range.

The Project for the Conservation and Management of the Natural Resources of the Aïr-Ténéré, a joint venture between the government of Niger, the World Conservation Union (IUCN), and the World Wide Fund for Nature (WWF), is also based in Iferouane.

The town has one airport: Iferouane Airport .

History 
The Foureau-Lamy Mission, a French military expedition led by Fernand Foreau and Amédée-François Lamy, spent a number of months at Iferouane in 1899. The expedition stopped at Iferouane on 24 February 1899 to acquire additional pack animals, their number having dwindled from 1,004 to 585, and departed on 10 June 1899, heading for Agadez. During this time, the expeditionary force faced multiple attacks by Tuareg nomads and saw the size of its caravan dwindle from 585 camels to 75.

During Niger's colonial period, Iferouane was the northernmost military outpost in the French colony. In 1964, a few years after independence, the population of Iferouane cercle was approximately 10,000.

Second Tuareg Rebellion 

Iferouane was the site of the first attack carried out by the Niger Movement for Justice (MNJ),
which marked the beginning of the Second Tuareg Rebellion. Numerous clashes between rebel and government forces subsequently took place near the town, including an attack in early December 2007 against a supply convoy heading for Iferouane that resulted in the deaths of three soldiers and, according to the government, eight rebels.

In October 2007, the president of the SOS Iférouane Initiative, a local organisation involved with delivering supplies to the town, reported that – due to the insecurity caused by the rebellion – the residents of Iferouane had been without food for a number of weeks. He also reported an increase in the incidence of malaria and diarrhoea among the town's residents.

In November, Iferouane's deputy mayor reported that the town's entire population – approximately 5,000 residents – had left due to shortages of food, the Tuareg rebellion, and "harassment" by the army. The central government, based in Niamey, confirmed that supplies to the town were blocked due to the mining of roads by rebels, but denied that the town had been emptied.

In November 2008, a Radio France International reporter visited the town and described it as "empty of inhabitants", with the entire population having fled to Arlit or Agadez. During 2009, the inhabitants started to return and by September, about 90% of the population had returned and agriculture had restarted, despite damaged infrastructure.

Climate 
Iferouane receives, on average, in excess of 50 mm of rainfall per year, which falls in the course of a few heavy downpours during the summer months.

See also 
 Aouderas
 Timia
 Uranium mining

References 

Oases of Niger
Communes of Niger